Elm Street Methodist Church is a historic Methodist church building at 616 5th Avenue, South in Nashville, Tennessee.  The building no longer serves as a place of worship and has been converted to offices. In 2019 it will be Bob Dylan's Heaven's Door whiskey's distillery and brand experience center.

It was built in 1871 in an Italianate style and was added to the National Register of Historic Places in 1984.

References

Churches on the National Register of Historic Places in Tennessee
Italianate architecture in Tennessee
Churches completed in 1871
19th-century Methodist church buildings in the United States
Churches in Nashville, Tennessee
National Register of Historic Places in Nashville, Tennessee
Italianate church buildings in the United States